The TOJ SC205 and TOJ SC206 are very similar sports prototype race cars, designed, developed and built by German racing team and constructor, Team Obermoser Jörg; constructed to the FIA's Group 6 category and specification of motor racing, specifically the European 2-Litre Sportscar Championship, in 1977 and 1978, respectively. Together, they won a total of 6 races, scored 28 podium finishes, and clinched 2 pole positions, plus an additional 12 class wins together. Like its predecessor SC204, it was powered by a naturally-aspirated  BMW M12/7 four-cylinder engine; producing .

References

Sports prototypes
24 Hours of Le Mans race cars